No 

Molde FK is a Norwegian professional football club based in Molde, Møre og Romsdal. The club was founded as International in 1911. The club changed its name to Molde in 1915. Molde FK currently play in the Eliteserien, the top tier of Norwegian football. They have not been out of the top tier since 2007. They have been involved in European football several times since their debut in 1975. In 1999 Molde became the second Norwegian club to enter the UEFA Champions League.

Erling Moe is the current manager of the club since taking over as a caretaker manager on 19 December 2018 when Ole Gunnar Solskjær left the position to manage Manchester United as a caretaker manager. On 29 April 2019 it was announced that Moe signed a contract as permanent head coach till the end of the 2020 season.

The most successful person to manage Molde is Ole Gunnar Solskjær, who won two Eliteserien titles and one Norwegian Cup, all in his first of two managerial spells at the club. The longest-serving head coach in terms of games is Åge Hareide, who lead Molde in 280 games in all competitions between 1986 and 1997.

Statistics
The list shows every person with the main responsibility for Molde FKs performances since this position was created ahead of the 1956–57 season. This role has had different names over the years; "Coach", "Head Coach" and "Manager".

Information correct as of 12 December 2021. Only competitive matches are counted (League, Promotion/relegation play-offs, Cup, Europe).
Table headers
 Nationality – If the manager played international football as a player, the country/countries he played for are shown. Otherwise, the manager's nationality is given as their country of birth.
 From – The year of the manager's first game for Molde FK.
 To – The year of the manager's last game for Molde FK.
 P – The number of games managed for Molde FK.
 W – The number of games won as a manager.
 D – The number of games draw as a manager.
 L – The number of games lost as a manager.
 GF – The number of goals scored under his management.
 GA – The number of goals conceded under his management.
 Win% – The total winning percentage under his management.
 Honours – The trophies won while managing Molde FK.
Key
 (n/a) = Information not available
 p = Player-manager

Longest-serving managers
This list contains managers leading Molde FK in more than 100 matches.

Notes

References

managers
Molde FK